Field hockey competitions at the 2019 Pan American Games in Lima, Peru were scheduled to be held from July 30 to August 10. The venue for the competition is the Hockey field located at the Villa María del Triunfo cluster. A total of eight men's and eight women's teams (each consisting up to 16 athletes) competed in each tournament. This means a total of 256 athletes are scheduled to compete.

The winner of each competition will qualify for the 2020 Summer Olympics in Tokyo, Japan.

Medal table

Medalists

Participating nations
Nine countries qualified field hockey teams. The numbers of participants qualified is in parentheses.

Qualification
A total of eight men's teams and eight women's team will qualify to compete at the games in each tournament. The host nation (Peru) received automatic qualification in both tournaments. The top two teams at the 2018 Central American and Caribbean Games and 2018 South American Games also qualified. The top two teams not yet qualified from the 2017 Pan American Cups (after the results from the above two tournaments are taken into account) also qualified. If the Canada and/or the United States have not qualified still, a playoff between the nations and the third ranked at the Pan American Cups will take place. If both nations do qualify, the playoff will be not necessary and the third placed team at each Pan American Cup will qualify. The Pan American Hockey Federation (PAHF) officially announced the qualified teams on September 10, 2018.

Men

A playoff was not necessary, as Canada and the United States were the top two teams not qualified from the 2017 Men's Pan American Cup.

Women

A playoff was not held, and Canada was automatically given the spot.

Men's tournament

Preliminary round

Pool A

Pool B

Classification round

Final standings

Women's tournament

Preliminary round

Pool A

Pool B

Classification round

Final standings

 Qualified for the 2020 Summer Olympics

See also
Field hockey at the 2020 Summer Olympics

References

External links
Results book

 
Events at the 2019 Pan American Games
2019 Pan American Games
Pan American Games
2019 Pan American Games